Shamli or Shāmlī (الشوملي) is  a town of Basrah Governorate in southern Iraq, northeast of Shahbāzīyah, northwest of Chalabīyah and south of Ad Dawār.

Shāmlī has an elevation of 5 metres, and is on the east bank of the Shatt Al-Arab River at 30° 56' 21" North, 47° 29' 32"East.

References

Populated places in Basra Province